Kwame Amoateng (born 8 August 1987) is a Swedish professional footballer of Ghanaian origin who plays for GAIS.

Early life 
Born in Gothenburg, Sweden to parents from Ghana, Amoateng was raised in England by Jamaican adoptive parents.

Career

Club career
Amoateng began his career in England with Grimsby Town, before moving onto Lundby IF in Sweden. While at GAIS he has spent loan spells with FC Trollhättan and Husqvarna FF.

International career 
Amoateng has been a member of the Sweden national under-19 football team.

External links
Player profile at PlayerHistory.com 
Player profile at GAIS 
Player profile at Football-Lineups.com
Profile at GhanaWeb

1987 births
Living people
Swedish footballers
Grimsby Town F.C. players
GAIS players
Swedish people of Ghanaian descent
FC Trollhättan players
Husqvarna FF players
Association football forwards
Footballers from Gothenburg